The Bergmann MG 15nA was a World War I light machine gun produced by Germany starting in 1915. It used 100- and 200-round belts and utilized a bipod, which allowed the weapon to be mounted on a flat surface for more accurate firing. It was briefly put back into service during the closing months of World War II in Europe by German Volkssturm units who lacked modern equipment and were little more than suicide squads meant to mount a hopeless last defense. Nazi Germany was using any weapon they had available during the last part of the war due to failing production and resupply.

Design and development
The Bergmann gun used a lock system patented by Theodor Bergmann in 1901 along with the short recoil principle of operation. The locking system, in which a cam moves a lock vertically in the weapon, was not dissimilar to the Browning machine gun designs. The original design, borrowing from the 1910 pattern, was a heavy ground-based weapon fitted with a water-cooling jacket. The weapon was then lightened for both infantry and aircraft use. For aircraft usage, the bolt was lightened and the mechanism sped up from 500 rounds per minute to 800. For ground use, this weapon was adopted as the Bergmann MG 15. The receiver to the weapon was machined down and lightened, featured a butt stock fitted to the end of the weapon. It was given a pistol grip and trigger grouping instead of spade grips, the heavy cooling jacket was replaced with a thin perforated barrel shroud and a bipod was fitted halfway down the barrel.

The major development of the weapon came early in 1916 when the Bergmann MG 15 was converted into a second variation to mirror the development of the Maxim MG 08/15. The bolt was slowed back down as the original had stoppage issues when used in the ground role. The bipod was removed from the flimsy barrel shroud and relocated to just forward of the pistol grip using a swivel-mount that accepted the bipod shared between the Bergmann and Maxim guns. A carry handle and new sights were also added. When this variation was adopted, it was called the Bergmann MG 15nA, the nA standing for neuer Art ('new model'). The old pattern was then renamed the Bergmann MG 15aA for alter Art ('old model'). The MG 15nA saw much more frequent use amongst Imperial German forces than the MG 15aA.

Service use
Battlefield usage of the weapon was significant, but not to the extent of the Maxim weapons. The Bergmann MG 15nA was an important weapon in that it filled a gap in the German armory between the rifle and the heavy machine gun. The only other light machine guns the Imperial German Army fielded before the Bergmann was adopted were the various Madsen machine guns used by the Musketen battalions. In the 1916 Battle of the Somme, the German Army found that they desperately needed a weapon to counter the British Army's Lewis light machine gun. The limited quantities of the Madsen gun only added to the need for a light machine gun. Germany did not produce any Madsens in the First World War and relied almost entirely on captured weaponry. Madsen machine guns were used between a mix of examples captured from a shipment heading to Bulgaria and others supplied by the Austrians. The German Army, reeling from the Battle of the Somme, ordered some 6,000 MG 15nA examples in November 1916. These weapons were distributed to Musketen and other infantry battalions before enough troops could be trained upon the new MG 08/15 in the winter/spring of 1917. The majority of MG 15nA weapons were actually delivered to the Eastern and Palestine fronts where the German Asia Corps made the most significant use of the gun. The limitation of the weapon was that its air-cooled barrel would overheat after 250 rounds of sustained fire. They were therefore grouped into sections in which the tactical positioning allowed the gunners to open fire alternately or were attributed to mobile detachments that did not require long sustained fire. The German Leichtmaschinengewehr Truppen (LMGt) were formed specifically for the weapon. The MG 15nA was a generally reliable gun that served until the manufacture of automatic weaponry was ceased in 1919 under the Treaty of Versailles, but the dominance of the Maxim 08 during the war meant it never acquired much enthusiasm from military officials. The weapon had faded into obscurity by the time the Second World War came about, though some were used by the Republicans during the Spanish Civil War.

Users 
 : M1910 purchased during the warlord era

: 52 in stock of the Latvian Army by April 1936
: used by Volkssturm

Sources

External links
 http://www.firstworldwar.com/atoz/mgun_mg15na.htm
 picture of MG15 nA
 Mitrailleuse Bergmann LMG 15 aA and nA

1916 establishments in Germany
1919 disestablishments in Germany
7.92×57mm Mauser machine guns
World War I machine guns
World War I German infantry weapons
Light machine guns
Machine guns of Germany
Weapons of the Ottoman Empire